Great East Lake is an  water body located in Carroll County, New Hampshire, and York County, Maine, in the United States. The lake is shared by the towns of Wakefield, New Hampshire, and Acton, Maine, with 45% of its surface area in Acton and 55% in Wakefield. The lake is the farthest upstream of the five headwater lakes of the Salmon Falls River, a tributary of the Piscataqua River. Water from Great East Lake flows out its dam and through the  Newichawannock Canal into Horn Pond, then into the Salmon Falls River below Horn Pond.

The widest part of the lake is in New Hampshire. The lake narrows to the east in Maine, creating the First, Second and Third basins. Great East Lake is the largest of the Salmon Falls headwater lakes.

Great East Lake supports abundant wildlife, and 21 fish species including lake trout (togue), rainbow trout, smallmouth bass, largemouth bass, American eel, hornpout, white perch, black crappie and chain pickerel.

Water quality monitoring data has been collected since 1974, including 29 years of secchi disk transparencies, 23 years of total phosphorus (TP) data, 20 years of chlorophyll-a (Chl-a) data and 7 years of dissolved oxygen (DO) profiles. The data indicates that Great East Lake is a high quality water by both the Maine Department of Environmental Protection and New Hampshire Department of Environmental Services standards.

Great East Lake is part of the Piscataqua River major drainage basin and the Salmon Falls River subdrainage basin. Great East Lake flows into Horn Pond which in turn starts the Salmon Falls River at its outflow. The Salmon Falls River then flows into the Piscataqua River and into the Great Bay estuary and the Gulf of Maine.

The Great East Lake watershed is currently 66% forested, 9% developed, and 52% buildable area. The shoreline of Great East Lake is composed of primarily medium density residential houses and camps (77%). The majority of these structures (64%) are within  of the shoreline.

The Great East Lake Improvement Association (GELIA) was founded in 1932 and has been dedicated to the welfare of Great East Lake, its wildlife, and environment. The nonprofit organization sees education as its primary function to help protect the lake.

Great East Lake has several other programs and organizations dedicated to protecting its pristine water quality. A boat inspection program is run by the NH Lake Host Program where over 1,000 boats are inspected annually for invasive aquatic plants. There is also a weed watchers program (similar to the Invasive Plants Patrollers Program in Maine).

See also

List of lakes in Maine
List of lakes in New Hampshire

References

External links
Great East Lake Improvement Association

Lakes of York County, Maine
Lakes of Carroll County, New Hampshire
Lakes of Maine
Lakes of New Hampshire